Hellinsia pectodactylus is a moth of the family Pterophoridae. It is found in Europe (the Iberian Peninsula, France, Germany, Switzerland, Sardinia, Greece, Cyprus and southern Russia), the Canary Islands, Kyrgyzstan, Afghanistan, India and North America (including the Rocky Mountains, Oregon, Alberta, British Columbia, Ontario).

The wingspan is 19–20 mm.

The larvae feed on Solidago virgaurea, Aster linosyris and Phagnalon saxatile.

References

pectodactylus
Moths described in 1859
Moths of North America
Plume moths of Asia
Plume moths of Europe
Taxa named by Otto Staudinger